The Tiga GC84, also known as the Tiga GC284, is a sports prototype race car, designed, developed, and built by British manufacturer Tiga Race Cars, for sports car racing, conforming to the Group C1/C2 rules and regulations, in 1984.

References

Sports prototypes
Group C cars